Joan Dolores Wilson (born May 28, 1933) is an American composer and harpist. She studied music at the University of California (Chico) and with Janet Leigh-Taylor, Dorothy Ramsen, Robert Maxwell, Ann Stephens, Beverly Bellows, and Julie Gustavson.

Wilson has played harp with several orchestras and on radio and television. Her compositions include:

Chamber 

Harper's Tunes for Troubadors (harp)
Paradise in Blue (piano)

Vocal 

Le Jardin de Versailles
Wind Song

References 

American women composers
1933 births
Living people
University of California alumni
American harpists
Women harpists